¿Hay Corazón? was a Venezuelan dating game show produced and aired by Televen in 2012, and hosted by Caterina Valentino.

Televen's general manager, Leonardo Bigott, declared that they had taken the official regulations into account when the show was first announced, and that the show's contents complied with what is established by law.

References 

Dating and relationship reality television series
2012 Venezuelan television series debuts
2012 Venezuelan television series endings
2010s Venezuelan television series
Venezuelan reality television series